Father of the Godfathers is a 1978 Italian crime film directed by Pasquale Squitieri. It stars Claudia Cardinale, Giuliano Gemma and Tony Kendall and is set in Sicily in the 1950s. Gemma was awarded 1979 Best Actor at the Montréal World Film Festival for his role.

Cast

Production
Father of the Godfathers was inspired by Orazio Barrese's book I complici, Gli anni dell'antimafia. The book was the story of the Mafia boss Luciano Liggio. After the release of Squitieri's previous film I Am the Law, Mario Cecchi Gori approached him to make an adaptation. Barrese and Squitieri were friends, but later stated that "I don't consider Father of the Godfathers as one of my best works, it's definitely inferior to I Am the Law."

Release
Father of the Godfathers was distributed theatrically in Italy by Cineriz on 4 November 1978. Film historian and critic Roberto Curti stated that the film was a huge commercial success in Italy, grossing 2,304,300,190 Italian lire.

Reception
From a contemporary review, film critic Lino Micciche wrote that the film "is harmed by the multiplicity of tones, rhythms and styles, which foul up the results in both directions it aims at, therefore the film oscillates [...] between popular ballad and turgid comic book, historical recreation and inquiry, the Western genre and committed cinema, echoing from time to time Germi and Rosi, Petri and Damiani[...]."

Notes

References

External links

1978 films
Films directed by Pasquale Squitieri
Films about the Sicilian Mafia
Films set in the 1950s
Italian crime films
1970s Italian-language films
Films scored by Ennio Morricone
1970s Italian films